Lepidocordia is a genus of flowering plants belonging to the family Boraginaceae.

Its native range is Southern Mexico to Northern Brazil.

Species:

Lepidocordia punctata 
Lepidocordia williamsii

References

Ehretioideae
Boraginaceae genera
Taxa named by Adolpho Ducke